Henriette Conté (died 12 May 2020) was a widow of former President of Guinea Lansana Conté. She was First Lady of Guinea from 5 April 1984 until his death on 22 December 2008.

References

First ladies of Guinea
2020 deaths
Year of birth missing
Place of birth missing